There are seven stable isotopes of mercury (80Hg) with 202Hg being the most abundant (29.86%). The longest-lived radioisotopes are 194Hg with a half-life of 444 years, and 203Hg with a half-life of 46.612 days. Most of the remaining 40 radioisotopes have half-lives that are less than a day. 199Hg and 201Hg are the most often studied NMR-active nuclei, having spin quantum numbers of 1/2 and 3/2 respectively. All isotopes of mercury are either radioactive or observationally stable, meaning that they are predicted to be radioactive but no actual decay has been observed. These isotopes are predicted to undergo either alpha decay or double beta decay.

180Hg, producible from 180Tl, was found in 2010 to be capable of an unusual form of spontaneous fission. The fission products are 80Kr and 100Ru.

List of isotopes 

|-
| 170Hg
| style="text-align:right" | 80
| style="text-align:right" | 90
| 
| 80(+400-40) μs
| α
| 166Pt
| 0+
|
|
|-
| 171Hg
| style="text-align:right" | 80
| style="text-align:right" | 91
| 171.00376(32)#
| 80(30) μs[59(+36−16) μs]
| α
| 167Pt
| 3/2−#
|
|
|-
| 172Hg
| style="text-align:right" | 80
| style="text-align:right" | 92
| 171.99883(22)
| 420(240) μs[0.25(+35−9) ms]
| α
| 168Pt
| 0+
|
|
|-
| 173Hg
| style="text-align:right" | 80
| style="text-align:right" | 93
| 172.99724(22)#
| 1.1(4) ms[0.6(+5−2) ms]
| α
| 169Pt
| 3/2−#
|
|
|-
| 174Hg
| style="text-align:right" | 80
| style="text-align:right" | 94
| 173.992864(21)
| 2.0(4) ms[2.1(+18−7) ms]
| α
| 170Pt
| 0+
|
|
|-
| 175Hg
| style="text-align:right" | 80
| style="text-align:right" | 95
| 174.99142(11)
| 10.8(4) ms
| α
| 171Pt
| 5/2−#
|
|
|-
| rowspan=2|176Hg
| rowspan=2 style="text-align:right" | 80
| rowspan=2 style="text-align:right" | 96
| rowspan=2|175.987355(15)
| rowspan=2|20.4(15) ms
| α (98.6%)
| 172Pt
| rowspan=2|0+
| rowspan=2|
| rowspan=2|
|-
| β+ (1.4%)
| 176Au
|-
| rowspan=2|177Hg
| rowspan=2 style="text-align:right" | 80
| rowspan=2 style="text-align:right" | 97
| rowspan=2|176.98628(8)
| rowspan=2|127.3(18) ms
| α (85%)
| 173Pt
| rowspan=2|5/2−#
| rowspan=2|
| rowspan=2|
|-
| β+ (15%)
| 177Au
|-
| rowspan=2|178Hg
| rowspan=2 style="text-align:right" | 80
| rowspan=2 style="text-align:right" | 98
| rowspan=2|177.982483(14)
| rowspan=2|0.269(3) s
| α (70%)
| 174Pt
| rowspan=2|0+
| rowspan=2|
| rowspan=2|
|-
| β+ (30%)
| 178Au
|-
| rowspan=3|179Hg
| rowspan=3 style="text-align:right" | 80
| rowspan=3 style="text-align:right" | 99
| rowspan=3|178.981834(29)
| rowspan=3|1.09(4) s
| α (53%)
| 175Pt
| rowspan=3|5/2−#
| rowspan=3|
| rowspan=3|
|-
| β+ (47%)
| 179Au
|-
| β+, p (.15%)
| 178Pt
|-
| rowspan=3|180Hg
| rowspan=3 style="text-align:right" | 80
| rowspan=3 style="text-align:right" | 100
| rowspan=3|179.978266(15)
| rowspan=3|2.58(1) s
| β+ (52%)
| 180Au
| rowspan=3|0+
| rowspan=3|
| rowspan=3|
|-
| α (48%)
| 176Pt
|-
| SF
| 100Ru, 80Kr
|-
| rowspan=4|181Hg
| rowspan=4 style="text-align:right" | 80
| rowspan=4 style="text-align:right" | 101
| rowspan=4|180.977819(17)
| rowspan=4|3.6(1) s
| β+ (64%)
| 181Au
| rowspan=4|1/2(−)
| rowspan=4|
| rowspan=4|
|-
| α (36%)
| 177Pt
|-
| β+, p (.014%)
| 180Pt
|-
| β+, α (9×10−6%)
| 177Ir
|-
| style="text-indent:1em" | 181mHg
| colspan="3" style="text-indent:2em" | 210(40)# keV
|
|
|
| 13/2+
|
|
|-
| rowspan=3|182Hg
| rowspan=3 style="text-align:right" | 80
| rowspan=3 style="text-align:right" | 102
| rowspan=3|181.97469(1)
| rowspan=3|10.83(6) s
| β+ (84.8%)
| 182Au
| rowspan=3|0+
| rowspan=3|
| rowspan=3|
|-
| α (15.2%)
| 178Pt
|-
| β+, p (10−5%)
| 181Pt
|-
| rowspan=3|183Hg
| rowspan=3 style="text-align:right" | 80
| rowspan=3 style="text-align:right" | 103
| rowspan=3|182.974450(9)
| rowspan=3|9.4(7) s
| β+ (74.5%)
| 183Au
| rowspan=3|1/2−
| rowspan=3|
| rowspan=3|
|-
| α (25.5%)
| 179Pt
|-
| β+, p (5.6×10−4%)
| 182Pt
|-
| style="text-indent:1em" | 183m1Hg
| colspan="3" style="text-indent:2em" | 198(14) keV
|
|
|
| 13/2+#
|
|
|-
| style="text-indent:1em" | 183m2Hg
| colspan="3" style="text-indent:2em" | 240(40)# keV
| 5# s
| β+
| 183Au
| 13/2+#
|
|
|-
| rowspan=2|184Hg
| rowspan=2 style="text-align:right" | 80
| rowspan=2 style="text-align:right" | 104
| rowspan=2|183.971713(11)
| rowspan=2|30.6(3) s
| β+ (98.89%)
| 184Au
| rowspan=2|0+
| rowspan=2|
| rowspan=2|
|-
| α (1.11%)
| 180Pt
|-
| rowspan=2|185Hg
| rowspan=2 style="text-align:right" | 80
| rowspan=2 style="text-align:right" | 105
| rowspan=2|184.971899(17)
| rowspan=2|49.1(10) s
| β+ (94%)
| 185Au
| rowspan=2|1/2−
| rowspan=2|
| rowspan=2|
|-
| α (6%)
| 181Pt
|-
| rowspan=3 style="text-indent:1em" | 185mHg
| rowspan=3 colspan="3" style="text-indent:2em" | 99.3(5) keV
| rowspan=3|21.6(15) s
| IT (54%)
| 185Hg
| rowspan=3|13/2+
| rowspan=3|
| rowspan=3|
|-
| β+ (46%)
| 185Au
|-
| α (.03%)
| 181Pt
|-
| rowspan=2|186Hg
| rowspan=2 style="text-align:right" | 80
| rowspan=2 style="text-align:right" | 106
| rowspan=2|185.969362(12)
| rowspan=2|1.38(6) min
| β+ (99.92%)
| 186Au
| rowspan=2|0+
| rowspan=2|
| rowspan=2|
|-
| α (.016%)
| 182Pt
|-
| style="text-indent:1em" | 186mHg
| colspan="3" style="text-indent:2em" | 2217.3(4) keV
| 82(5) μs
|
|
| (8−)
|
|
|-
| rowspan=2|187Hg
| rowspan=2 style="text-align:right" | 80
| rowspan=2 style="text-align:right" | 107
| rowspan=2|186.969814(15)
| rowspan=2|1.9(3) min
| β+
| 187Au
| rowspan=2|3/2−
| rowspan=2|
| rowspan=2|
|-
| α (1.2×10−4%)
| 183Pt
|-
| rowspan=2 style="text-indent:1em" | 187mHg
| rowspan=2 colspan="3" style="text-indent:2em" | 59(16) keV
| rowspan=2|2.4(3) min
| β+
| 187Au
| rowspan=2|13/2+
| rowspan=2|
| rowspan=2|
|-
| α (2.5×10−4%)
| 183Pt
|-
| rowspan=2|188Hg
| rowspan=2 style="text-align:right" | 80
| rowspan=2 style="text-align:right" | 108
| rowspan=2|187.967577(12)
| rowspan=2|3.25(15) min
| β+
| 188Au
| rowspan=2|0+
| rowspan=2|
| rowspan=2|
|-
| α (3.7×10−5%)
| 184Pt
|-
| style="text-indent:1em" | 188mHg
| colspan="3" style="text-indent:2em" | 2724.3(4) keV
| 134(15) ns
|
|
| (12+)
|
|
|-
| rowspan=2|189Hg
| rowspan=2 style="text-align:right" | 80
| rowspan=2 style="text-align:right" | 109
| rowspan=2|188.96819(4)
| rowspan=2|7.6(1) min
| β+
| 189Au
| rowspan=2|3/2−
| rowspan=2|
| rowspan=2|
|-
| α (3×10−5%)
| 185Pt
|-
| rowspan=2 style="text-indent:1em" | 189mHg
| rowspan=2 colspan="3" style="text-indent:2em" | 80(30) keV
| rowspan=2|8.6(1) min
| β+
| 189Au
| rowspan=2|13/2+
| rowspan=2|
| rowspan=2|
|-
| α (3×10−5%)
| 185Pt
|-
| rowspan=2|190Hg
| rowspan=2 style="text-align:right" | 80
| rowspan=2 style="text-align:right" | 110
| rowspan=2|189.966322(17)
| rowspan=2|20.0(5) min
| β+
| 190Au
| rowspan=2|0+
| rowspan=2|
| rowspan=2|
|-
| α (5×10−5%)
| 186Pt
|-
| 191Hg
| style="text-align:right" | 80
| style="text-align:right" | 111
| 190.967157(24)
| 49(10) min
| β+
| 191Au
| 3/2(−)
|
|
|-
| style="text-indent:1em" | 191mHg
| colspan="3" style="text-indent:2em" | 128(22) keV
| 50.8(15) min
| β+
| 191Au
| 13/2+
|
|
|-
| rowspan=2|192Hg
| rowspan=2 style="text-align:right" | 80
| rowspan=2 style="text-align:right" | 112
| rowspan=2|191.965634(17)
| rowspan=2|4.85(20) h
| EC
| 192Au
| rowspan=2|0+
| rowspan=2|
| rowspan=2|
|-
| α (4×10−6%)
| 188Pt
|-
| 193Hg
| style="text-align:right" | 80
| style="text-align:right" | 113
| 192.966665(17)
| 3.80(15) h
| β+
| 193Au
| 3/2−
|
|
|-
| rowspan=2 style="text-indent:1em" | 193mHg
| rowspan=2 colspan="3" style="text-indent:2em" | 140.76(5) keV
| rowspan=2|11.8(2) h
| β+ (92.9%)
| 193Au
| rowspan=2|13/2+
| rowspan=2|
| rowspan=2|
|-
| IT (7.1%)
| 193Hg
|-
| 194Hg
| style="text-align:right" | 80
| style="text-align:right" | 114
| 193.965439(13)
| 444(77) y
| EC
| 194Au
| 0+
|
|
|-
| 195Hg
| style="text-align:right" | 80
| style="text-align:right" | 115
| 194.966720(25)
| 10.53(3) h
| β+
| 195Au
| 1/2−
|
|
|-
| rowspan=2 style="text-indent:1em" | 195mHg
| rowspan=2 colspan="3" style="text-indent:2em" | 176.07(4) keV
| rowspan=2|41.6(8) h
| IT (54.2%)
| 195Hg
| rowspan=2|13/2+
| rowspan=2|
| rowspan=2|
|-
| β+ (45.8%)
| 195Au
|-
| 196Hg
| style="text-align:right" | 80
| style="text-align:right" | 116
| 195.965833(3)
| colspan=3 align=center|Observationally Stable
| 0+
| 0.0015(1)
|
|-
| 197Hg
| style="text-align:right" | 80
| style="text-align:right" | 117
| 196.967213(3)
| 64.14(5) h
| EC
| 197Au
| 1/2−
|
|
|-
| rowspan=2 style="text-indent:1em" | 197mHg
| rowspan=2 colspan="3" style="text-indent:2em" | 298.93(8) keV
| rowspan=2|23.8(1) h
| IT (91.4%)
| 197Hg
| rowspan=2|13/2+
| rowspan=2|
| rowspan=2|
|-
| EC (8.6%)
| 197Au
|-
| 198Hg
| style="text-align:right" | 80
| style="text-align:right" | 118
| 197.9667690(4)
| colspan=3 align=center|Observationally Stable
| 0+
| 0.0997(20)
|
|-
| 199Hg
| style="text-align:right" | 80
| style="text-align:right" | 119
| 198.9682799(4)
| colspan=3 align=center|Observationally Stable
| 1/2−
| 0.1687(22)
|
|-
| style="text-indent:1em" | 199mHg
| colspan="3" style="text-indent:2em" | 532.48(10) keV
| 42.66(8) min
| IT
| 199Hg
| 13/2+
|
|
|-
| 200Hg
| style="text-align:right" | 80
| style="text-align:right" | 120
| 199.9683260(4)
| colspan=3 align=center|Observationally Stable
| 0+
| 0.2310(19)
|
|-
| 201Hg
| style="text-align:right" | 80
| style="text-align:right" | 121
| 200.9703023(6)
| colspan=3 align=center|Observationally Stable
| 3/2−
| 0.1318(9)
|
|-
| style="text-indent:1em" | 201mHg
| colspan="3" style="text-indent:2em" | 766.22(15) keV
| 94(3) μs
|
|
| 13/2+
|
|
|-
| 202Hg
| style="text-align:right" | 80
| style="text-align:right" | 122
| 201.9706430(6)
| colspan=3 align=center|Observationally Stable
| 0+
| 0.2986(26)
|
|-
| 203Hg
| style="text-align:right" | 80
| style="text-align:right" | 123
| 202.9728725(18)
| 46.595(6) d
| β−
| 203Tl
| 5/2−
|
|
|-
| style="text-indent:1em" | 203mHg
| colspan="3" style="text-indent:2em" | 933.14(23) keV
| 24(4) μs
|
|
| (13/2+)
|
|
|-
| 204Hg
| style="text-align:right" | 80
| style="text-align:right" | 124
| 203.9734939(4)
| colspan=3 align=center|Observationally Stable
| 0+
| 0.0687(15)
|
|-
| 205Hg
| style="text-align:right" | 80
| style="text-align:right" | 125
| 204.976073(4)
| 5.14(9) min
| β−
| 205Tl
| 1/2−
|
|
|-
| style="text-indent:1em" | 205mHg
| colspan="3" style="text-indent:2em" | 1556.40(17) keV
| 1.09(4) ms
| IT
| 205Hg
| 13/2+
|
|
|-
| 206Hg
| style="text-align:right" | 80
| style="text-align:right" | 126
| 205.977514(22)
| 8.15(10) min
| β−
| 206Tl
| 0+
| Trace
|
|-
| 207Hg
| style="text-align:right" | 80
| style="text-align:right" | 127
| 206.98259(16)
| 2.9(2) min
| β−
| 207Tl
| (9/2+)
|
|
|-
| 208Hg
| style="text-align:right" | 80
| style="text-align:right" | 128
| 207.98594(32)#
| 42(5) min[41(+5−4) min]
| β−
| 208Tl
| 0+
|
|
|-
| 209Hg
| style="text-align:right" | 80
| style="text-align:right" | 129
| 208.99104(21)#
| 37(8) s
|
|
| 9/2+#
|
|
|-
| 210Hg
| style="text-align:right" | 80
| style="text-align:right" | 130
| 209.99451(32)#
| 10# min[>300 ns]
|
|
| 0+
|
|
|-
| 211Hg
| style="text-align:right" | 80
| style="text-align:right" | 131
| 210.99380(200)#
| 26(8) s
|
|
| 9/2+#
|
|
|-
| 212Hg
| style="text-align:right" | 80
| style="text-align:right" | 132
| 212.02760(300)#
| 1# min[>300 ns]
|
|
| 0+
|
|
|-
| 213Hg
| style="text-align:right" | 80
| style="text-align:right" | 133
| 213.07670(300)#
| 1# s[>300 ns]
|
|
| 5/2+#
|
|
|-
| 214Hg
| style="text-align:right" | 80
| style="text-align:right" | 134
| 214.11180(400)#
| 1# s[>300 ns]
|
|
| 0+
|
|
|-
| 215Hg
| style="text-align:right" | 80
| style="text-align:right" | 135
| 215.16210(400)#
| 1# s[>300 ns]
|
|
| 3/2+#
|
|
|-
| 216Hg
| style="text-align:right" | 80
| style="text-align:right" | 136
| 216.19860(400)#
| 100# ms[>300 ns]
|
|
| 0+
|
|

Particular Isotopes

Hg-196
However, given that a costly step of isotope separation would have to precede the already costly process of transmutation, this has (as of 2022) mostly remained a theoretical curiosity rather than an actual area of research.

Hg-198
At roughly 10% of natural Mercury, Hg-198 is neither particularly abundant nor particularly rare. It has a non-negligible gamma ray cross section for the (γ, n) reaction with 10 Mega-Electronvolt Gamma Rays. This reaction, in addition to serving as a potential neutron source could also be used to produce Hg-197 and via electron capture produce  - stable gold. Given that it is roughly two orders of magnitude more abundant that Hg-196, the required isotopic separation, even it required a further step of separating the lighter Hg-196 from the heavier Hg-198 could be achieved with a better yield for any given effort than for Hg-196.

References 

 Isotope masses from:

 Isotopic compositions and standard atomic masses from:

 Half-life, spin, and isomer data selected from the following sources.

 
Mercury